The American Theological Society, founded in 1912, is the oldest professional theological society in North America. It has met at least once each year in various locations on the East Coast of the United States, lately at Princeton Theological Seminary in Princeton, New Jersey. Membership is by nomination and election, and is limited to 100 people at any given time. The purpose of the American Theological Society is to foster research excellence in the various theological disciplines and to cultivate collegial relationships.

Membership 
Membership in the American Theological Society is by nomination and election by two-thirds of the members voting at the annual meeting. The society's membership is capped at one hundred. There are several categories of membership. Active members of the American Theological Society are those who regularly attend its annual meetings and regularly pay the annual dues. Sustaining members are previously active members who have not attended a meeting within the past three years, but who have continued to pay the annual dues. Inactive members are those who have not attended at least one meeting within a three-year period and who have ceased to pay annual dues for at least three years. Members-designate are those who have been elected to membership but who have not yet attended an annual meeting.

Executive 
The American Theological Society's business is organized by an executive committee consisting of a president, a vice-president (who is also president-elect), the immediately past president, a secretary, a treasurer, a program officer, and membership officer, and two at-large members. All are elected by the society's membership at its annual meeting.

Presidents 
The presidents of the American Theological Society are as follows:

1912–1913: William Adams Brown
1913–1914: Daniel Evans
1914–1915: W. D. MacKenzie
1915–1916: George Cross
1916–1917: E. S. Drown
1917–1918: F. C. Porter
1918–1919: A. C. McGiffert
1919–1920: D. C. Macintosh
1920–1921: Rufus M. Jones
1921–1922: A. M. Dulles
1922–1923: Eugene W. Lyman
1923–1924: M. G. Evans
1924–1925: E. Hershey Sneath
1925–1926: A. L. Gillett
1926–1927: S. B. Meeser
1927–1928: A. C. Knudson
1928–1929: W. P. Ladd
1929–1930: R. M. Vaughan
1930–1931: John Baillie
1931–1932: Durant Drake
1932–1933: G. W. Richards
1933–1934: E. S. Brightman
1934–1935: J. B. Pratt
1935–1936: J. S. Bixler
1936–1937: W. K. Wright
1937–1938: W. M. Urban
1938–1939: R. E. Hume
1939–1940: A. G. Widgery
1940–1941: Angus Dun
1941–1942: George Thomas
1942–1943: Walter M. Horton
1943–1944: Paul Tillich
1944–1945: Vergilius Ferm
1945–1946: Douglas V. Steere
1946–1947: H. Richard Niebuhr
1947–1948: Reinhold Niebuhr
1948–1949: Norman Pittenger
1949–1950: E. A. Burtt
1950–1951: Richard Kroner
1951–1952: Morton S. Enslin
1952–1953: Henry P. Van Dusen
1953–1954: John C. Bennett
1954–1955: Otto Piper
1955–1956: Brand Blanshard
1956–1957: Clarence W. Hamilton
1957–1958: Nels S. F. Ferré
1958–1959: Shelton Smith
1959–1960: Albert Outler
1960–1961: John Knox
1961–1962: Harold DeWolf
1962–1963: Wilhelm Pauck
1963–1964: Peter Bertocci
1964–1965: Paul Ramsey
1965–1966: Paul Minear
1966–1967: Daniel Day Williams
1967–1968: John E. Smith
1968–1969: S. Paul Schilling
1969–1970: Paul Lehmann
1970–1971: George Hendry
1971–1972: Roger Hazelton
1972–1973: James Luther Adams
1973–1974: Eugene Fairweather
1974–1975: 
1975–1976: Roger L. Shinn
1976–1977: Frederick Ferré
1977–1978: J. Robert Nelson
1978–1979: Avery Dulles
1979–1980: Gordon D. Kaufman
1980–1981: Carl F. H. Henry
1981–1982: Eugene Borowitz
1982–1983: J. Alfred Martin Jr.
1983–1984: Charles West
1984–1985: Bernhard Anderson
1985–1986: John D. Godsey
1986–1987: Richard A. Norris Jr.
1987–1988: Paul Meyer
1988–1989: Paul van Buren
1989–1990: Charles Curran
1990–1991: Gabriel Fackre
1991–1992: Franz J. van Beeck
1992–1993: J. Deotis Roberts
1993–1994: Owen C. Thomas
1994–1995: Karlfried Froehlich
1995–1996: Edward LeRoy Long Jr.
1996–1997: Geoffrey Wainwright
1997–1998: Stanley S. Harakas
1998–1999: Robert W. Jenson
1999–2000: Joanne McWilliam
2000–2001: Michael Fahey
2001–2002: Christopher Morse
2002–2003: George Tavard
2003–2004: Robert K. Johnston
2004–2005: J. Philip Wogaman
2005–2006: Robert Cummings Neville
2006–2007: Elizabeth A. Johnson
2007–2008: Daniel L. Migliore
2008–2009: Max Stackhouse
2009–2010: Kathryn Tanner
2010–2011: Peter Slater
2011–2012: Peter Paris
2012–2013: Charles M. Wood
2013–2014: Francis Schüssler Fiorenza
2014–2015: M. Douglas Meeks
2015–2016: Peter C. Phan
2016-2017: Wesley Wildman

Related societies 
There are a number of other theological societies in North America.

Self-described national theological societies 
 Catholic Theological Society of America (founded in 1946)
 The Evangelical Theological Society (founded in 1949; website)
 Wesleyan Theological Society (founded in 1965; website)
 Orthodox Theological Society in America (founded in 1966; website)
 Adventist Theological Society (probably founded in 1988; website)

Self-described regional theological societies 
 American Theological Society Midwest Division (founded in 1927; website)
 Pacific Coast Theological Society (founded in 1939; website)
 College Theology Society (founded in 1953; website)
 Old Life Theological Society (founded around 2004; website)
 Fox Valley Theological Society (founded around 2009 or 2010; website)
 Boston Theological Society (founding year unknown; website)
 Theological Discussion Group, currently "New Haven Theological Discussion Group" (founding year unknown; no website)

External links 

Seminaries and theological colleges in the United States
1912 establishments in the United States
Theological societies